Owzun Qui-ye Yek (also Romanized as Owzūn Qū’ī-ye Yek; also known as Owzūn Qū’ī) is a village in Tazeh Kand Rural District, Tazeh Kand District, Parsabad County, Ardabil Province, Iran. At the 2006 census, its population was 466, in 107 families.

References 

Towns and villages in Parsabad County